The King's Bench Prison was a prison in Southwark, south London, England, from medieval times until it closed in 1880. It took its name from the King's Bench court of law in which cases of defamation, bankruptcy and other misdemeanours were heard; as such, the prison was often used as a debtor's prison until the practice was abolished in the 1860s. In 1842, it was renamed the Queen's Bench Prison, and became the Southwark Convict Prison in 1872.

Origins
The first prison was originally constructed from two houses and was situated in Angel Place, off Borough High Street, Southwark – as with other judicial buildings it was often targeted during uprisings, being burned in 1381 and 1450. During the reign of King Henry VIII, new prison buildings were constructed within an enclosing brick wall. This was eventually demolished in 1761.

New building

Its 1758 replacement was built at a cost of £7,800 on a  site close to St George's Fields (south of Borough Road, close to its junction with Blackman Street/Newington Causeway, and a short distance from Horsemonger Lane Gaol; today the site is occupied by the Scovell housing estate). Although much larger and better appointed than some other London prisons, the new King's Bench still gained a reputation for being dirty, overcrowded and prone to outbreaks of typhus. Debtors had to provide their own bedding, food and drink. Those who could afford it purchased 'Liberty of the Rules' allowing them to live within three square miles of the prison.

On 10 May 1768, the imprisonment in King's Bench of radical John Wilkes (for writing an article for The North Briton, that severely criticized King George III) prompted a riot – the Massacre of St George's Fields – in which five people were killed. Like the earlier buildings, this prison was also badly damaged in a fire started in the 1780 Gordon Riots. It was rebuilt 1780-84 by John Deval the King's Master Mason.

In 1842 it became the Queen's Prison taking debtors from the Marshalsea and Fleet Prisons and sending lunatics to Bedlam. Fees and the benefits they could buy were abolished, and soon after it passed into the hands of the Home Office during the 1870s, it was closed and demolished.

Literary connections
English dramatist Thomas Dekker was imprisoned in the King's Bench Prison because of a debt of £40 to the father of John Webster, from 1612 to 1619. In prison he continued to write.

In Charles Dickens' David Copperfield Mr Micawber is imprisoned for debt in the King's Bench Prison. Madeline Bray and her father lived within the Rules of the King's Bench in Nicholas Nickleby, while the prison is also discussed by Mr. Rugg and Arthur Clennam in Little Dorrit.

In Herman Melville's Billy Budd, Sailor, King's Bench is referred to when Melville describes John Claggart as being possibly arraigned at King's Bench.

In his The Diary of a Prison Governor, James William Newham (1825–1890) makes reference to the period that his step-father, Henry Benthall, spent in the Queen's Bench Prison (c.1839) for bankruptcy, after running up debts to the tune of £15,000 following the failure of his business as a wine merchant in the Strand. Newham (at this time aged 14) recalls "staying over on occasions" with his mother, in Benthall's rooms at the prison, where such proceedings were winked at "for a consideration". On his release from the Queen's Bench, Benthall was to live within "the rules of the prison" (i.e., in the immediate neighbourhood).

It could be said that Benthall's eventful and troubled monetary situation, and its consequences on his lifestyle and social standing, along with some of his rather dubious business partners, are reflected in the writings and characters of Charles Dickens. Newham notes in his diary that he lived and worked for Benthall for a period at Cecil Street, the Strand. Coincidentally, Dickens also lived in Cecil Street at that time. It was 12 years later that the diarist, through connections of his step-father, secured a position as clerk at Maidstone Gaol, which in turn led to Newham becoming Assistant Governor of Maidstone, and Governor of St Augustine's Prison, Canterbury, in 1878.

Between 1857 and 1876, Newham oversaw the hanging of 24 inmates (all of them murderers) including that of Frances Kidder in 1868. Kidder (25) was found guilty of drowning her 12-year-old step-daughter, Louisa Staples, in 12 inches of ditch water. Following a change in attitudes and the law, she became the last woman to be publicly executed in England. Less severe punishments included flogging (usually up to 20 lashes applied) and solitary confinement, as well as the daily routine of a six-hour shift spent on the treadmill for those prisoners set to hard labour.

Walter Besant's 1899 novel The Orange Girl  begins with its protagonist, William Halliday, a musician disinherited by his wealthy family, in the Rules of King's Bench Prison in London.

The part played by the prison in the life of the time is described by William Russell in his 1858 work “The Recollections of a Policeman”. From Chapter XIV, ‘The Martyrs of Chancery’:

Notable inmates

Maria Barrell (poet and playwright; imprisoned for debt in the 1780s)
Richard Baxter
Cesare Bossi, composer
Thomas Brown
Marc Isambard Brunel (engineer; imprisoned 1821 for debt)
Charles Clerke (officer in the Royal Navy who sailed on all three voyages of exploration with Captain James Cook)
Claude de la Colombière
William Combe
Edmund Curll
Alexander Davison (imprisoned 1804 for fraud)
Nathaniel Eaton (schoolmaster of Harvard College, clergyman; imprisoned for debt, died there 1674)
Edmund John Eyre
John Galt (imprisoned c. 1829)
Robert Gouger
Emma, Lady Hamilton
Thomas Curson Hansard (imprisoned on 9 July 1810 for libel)
Thomas Hawkes (MP for Dudley; imprisoned 1857 for debt)
Benjamin Haydon
Henry Hetherington
Alexander Holborne
William Hone
Jeremiah Lear (stockbroker, father of Edward Lear; imprisoned c. 1816 for bankruptcy)
Frederick John Manning (coroner of the Verge 1836–1853; imprisoned 1853–1855 for debt)
Daniel Mendoza (champion boxer of England)
John Pell
John Penry (martyr, briefly incarcerated before his execution in 1593)
Moses Pitt (publisher noted for publishing The Cry of the Oppressed, a moving appeal on behalf of himself and all prisoners for debt across the nation)
Edward Henry Purcell (grandson of Henry Purcell, organist, printer, music publisher; imprisoned 1761 for debt)
Mary Robinson (poet; imprisoned 1775 with husband for his debts)
Robert Recorde (mathematician; imprisoned for debt, died there 1558)
John Rushworth
Richard Ryan (poet, playwright, biographer; imprisoned March 1835 for debt)
John Shebbeare (satirist) for libel
Christopher Smart
Charlotte Turner Smith (poet; imprisoned 1784 with her husband Benjamin for his debts)
William Smith (geologist; imprisoned for debt, released 1819)
Andrew Robinson Stoney (MP for Newcastle upon Tyne, High Sheriff of Durham; imprisoned for conspiracy to abduct his wife, died there 1810)
John Horne Tooke
Samuel Vetch (1st Governor of Nova Scotia; imprisoned for debt, died there 1732)
John Wilkes

See also
Marshalsea

References

Year of establishment unknown
1880 disestablishments in England
Former buildings and structures in the London Borough of Southwark
History of the London Borough of Southwark
Defunct prisons in London
Debtors' prisons
Demolished prisons
Court of King's Bench (England)